Robert Schellander (born 31 January 1983) is an Austrian professional association football player who currently plays for Austrian Regional League side SC Bregenz. He plays as a midfielder.

References

1983 births
Living people
Austrian footballers
Association football midfielders
FC Kärnten players
Kapfenberger SV players
LASK players
SC Austria Lustenau players
SW Bregenz players
Austria under-21 international footballers
Austrian Regionalliga players